Acarlar may refer to the following places in Turkey:

 Acarlar, Amasra, a village in the district of Amasra, Bartın Province
 Acarlar, İncirliova, a town in the district of İncirliova, Aydın Province